Western Norway Emigration Center (Norwegian: Vestnorsk utvandrarsenter or Vestnorsk utvandringssenter) is an open-air  museum located at the village of Sletta on the island of Radøy in Vestland county, Norway. The museum consists of a small church and several  historical buildings which were  reassembled in a rural environment. The building were re-located from Minnesota and North Dakota from locations characterized by Norwegian American immigration during the end of the 19th and the beginning of the 20th century.

Museum Centre in Hordaland
Western Norway Emigration Center is operated in cooperation with the Museum Centre in Hordaland (Museumssenteret i Hordaland) which focusing on the preservation of the social and cultural history of Hordaland. King Harald and Queen Sonja have honored the museum with a visit. Western Norway Emigration Center is the site of several activities throughout the year including weddings, meetings, concerts, and festivals. There are  guided tours around the center. There is also a library with books about Norwegian emigration to North America.

Brampton Lutheran Church
In 1996, Brampton Lutheran Church was dismantled and moved from Brampton Township, Sargent County, North Dakota.  The entire church, with all inventory, was given as a gift to the Western Norwegian Emigration Center. Volunteers, both Norwegian and  American, dismantled the church for transport to Sletta, where it was re-assembled. Brampton Lutheran Church was subsequently consecrated by  Ole Hagesæther,  Bishop of the Diocese of Bjørgvin (1994–2008) and officially reopened as Emigrantkirka på Sletta.

Marboe Township School 
Dating from 1893, this is a typical one room school  from Sargent County, North Dakota. It was moved to Forman, North Dakota, near Brampton, in the 1960s where it was used as a museum. In 1997, Sargent County Farm Bureau donated the school to the Western Norwegian Emigration Center. It opened on July 8, 2000.

Dr. J.C. Serkland Medical Office 
This building was taken from Rothsay in Wilkin County, Minnesota. It was the office of Doctor John Christian Serkland (1872- 1948) during more than 50 years of medical practice. His grandchildren purchased the house and donated it to the Western Norwegian Emigration Center. It was officially opened on July 8, 2000.

Underwood Pioneer House 
The Underwood Pioneer House was the home of Andreas Seem (1820-1890), an immigrant from Nord-Trøndelag, Norway. The house was originally built following his arrival during 1869 in Underwood in Otter Tail County, Minnesota. Luverne Kiene, the great grandchild of Karen and Andreas Seem, donated the house to the Western Norwegian Emigration Center in 1997. It was officially opened on July 8, 2000.

Brampton School Teacher's Home 
This was apparently the oldest house in Brampton township. The year of construction is unknown, but the fireplace construction indicates that it is probably as old as the European settling of North Dakota. It housed the principal of the school until the 1930s. Sanford and Genevieve Cooper donated the house to the Western Norway Emigration Center in 1997. The house was officially opened on July 8, 2000.

Elizabeth Township Jail and Town Hall 
Elizabeth Township Jail and Town Hall were built in the 1880s and incorporated to one building. The jail with two cells was used until slightly after 1900. The Town Council of Elizabeth, Minnesota, donated the building to the Western Norwegian Emigration Center during the spring 2000. It was officially opened on July 6, 2002.

Asbjørn Ystebø
During a visit in the United States in 1992-93, Ystebø got the idea of establishing a Norwegian American center in his home village of Sletta. Rural townships in Minnesota and North Dakota had in many cases experienced dramatic population decreases. As a result, there were historic building available for relocation. Asbjørn Odd Ystebø would later receive the St. Olav's Medal based upon his engagement in Norwegian and American relations.

Gallery of Memorial Stones

References

External links 
Norway Emigration Center website
Museum Centre in Hordaland website

Open-air museums in Norway
Norwegian-American culture
Norwegian migration to North America
Museums in Vestland
Museums of human migration
Radøy
Relocated buildings and structures